Jharal Yow Yeh (born 22 December 1989) is an Australian former professional rugby league footballer who played for the Brisbane Broncos in the NRL. Yow Yeh spent his entire club career with the Broncos, which was cut short due to a bad leg break and complications.

Background
Yow Yeh was born in Brisbane, Queensland, to Rhonda Yow Yeh; Yow Yeh is an Aboriginal Australian of the Margany tribe and is also of part Chinese descent. His surname is Mandarin; his great-great-grandfather was Chinese and his grandmother was part Samoan and lived in Vanuatu before settling in Queensland. Yow Yeh is related to former Balmain Tigers player Kevin Yow Yeh, who died before Jharal was born. While Kevin Yow Yeh has often been reported as Jharal's great-uncle, he was actually Jharal's grandfather's first cousin; the family describes their relationship as "third cousins".

Yow Yeh attended Ferny Grove State High School, where he finished his senior education in 2006.  In 2007, Yow Yeh was in The Parramatta Eels junior system and played there for one season but then had his scholarship torn up and was told by then Parramatta recruitment chief Rod Reddy that he would never make first grade and would not be able to cut it.  When reflecting back on the moment he was told the news Yow Yeh said "Parramatta told me that I wouldn't be able to cut it and I thought that was it, I had no idea what I was going to do". After graduating from school Yow Yeh played junior football for West Arana Hills and Norths Devils. He played in the Under-20s for the Brisbane Broncos and was named in the 2008 National Youth Competition's team of the year.

Playing career
Yow Yeh made his National Rugby League debut for the Brisbane Broncos at Suncorp Stadium in the 2009 NRL season's Round 1 clash with the North Queensland Cowboys.

Yow Yeh was named to the Indigenous All Stars team in 2010, during which season he injured his leg, missing five rounds. The same year he was named to the Queensland rugby league team for Game II of the 2010 State of Origin series, but was not needed to play. He saw playing time for Queensland in the 2011 State of Origin series, scoring his first State of Origin try in his Game I debut. The same year he was named to the Australian national team, filling in for injured wingers Lote Tuqiri and Darius Boyd. 

On 3 November 2011 Yow Yeh was named international rookie of the year at the annual RLIF Awards dinner at the Tower of London.

Yow Yeh featured in the 2012 NRL All Stars Game as the right winger for the Indigenous All Stars team. Yow Yeh started strong in the 2012 NRL season, scoring a crucial try in the second half against the Parramatta Eels, the Broncos winning 18–6. In round 4 against the South Sydney Rabbitohs of the 2012 NRL season, Yow Yeh suffered compound fracture of the lower right leg. Down 12–0 at the time of his injury, the Broncos went on to win 20–12. However Yow Yeh's 2012 season was over with a serious injury described as "motorbike-like". On 28 April 2013, Yow Yeh returned to rugby league, playing second row for the Norths Devils.

Yow Yeh announced, in March 2014, that he would retire from the game after failing to fully recover from the leg injury he suffered in 2012.

Statistics

References

External links 
NRL profile
Jharal Yow Yeh at Brisbane Broncos
Jharal Yow Yeh at rleague.com

1989 births
Living people
Australian rugby league players
Rugby league players from Brisbane
Indigenous Australian rugby league players
Australian sportspeople of Chinese descent
Australian people of Vanuatuan descent
Australia national rugby league team players
Brisbane Broncos players
Queensland Rugby League State of Origin players
Indigenous All Stars players
Norths Devils players
Redcliffe Dolphins players
Rugby league wingers